Statistics of Belgian First Division in the 1902–03 season.

Overview

It was contested by 10 teams, and Racing Club de Bruxelles won the championship.

League standings

Championship Cup A

Championship Cup B

Final round

See also
1902–03 in Belgian football

References

1902
Belgian First Division, 1913-14
1902–03 in Belgian football